Nicholtown is a predominantly African-American community in Greenville, South Carolina.  Jacqueline Woodson's award-winning adolescent novel, Brown Girl Dreaming (2014) was based on recollections of her childhood in Nicholtown.

References

Neighborhoods in Greenville, South Carolina